Galina Murašova (born December 22, 1955, in Vilnius, Lithuania) is a retired female discus thrower, who competed for the Soviet Union at two Summer Olympics: 1980 and 1988. Her last name is sometimes also spelled as Murashova.

Murašova set the Lithuanian national record in the women's discus throw on August 18, 1984, in Prague, by throwing 72.14 metres. She claimed the silver medal in the women's discus throw event at the 1983 World Championships in Helsinki, Finland, behind East Germany's Martina Opitz.

Achievements

References

1955 births
Living people
Soviet female discus throwers
Lithuanian female discus throwers
Athletes (track and field) at the 1980 Summer Olympics
Athletes (track and field) at the 1988 Summer Olympics
Olympic athletes of the Soviet Union
Sportspeople from Vilnius
World Athletics Championships medalists
World Athletics Championships athletes for the Soviet Union
Friendship Games medalists in athletics